The Rabenkopf is a mountain in the Planeil group of the Ötztal Alps.

Mountains of South Tyrol
Mountains of the Alps
Alpine three-thousanders
Ötztal Alps